The Samariang Muslim Cemetery is the largest Muslim cemetery in Kuching city, Sarawak, Malaysia. It is located near Kampung Samariang near Petra Jaya. It is the final resting place of many prominent Malay Sarawakian personalities.

Notable burials 
 Dayang Rosnah Abang Madeli – Mother of Works Minister, Datuk Seri Fadillah Yusof
 Datuk Patinggi Tan Sri (Dr.) Haji Adenan bin Satem – 5th Chief Minister of Sarawak (2014–2017)
 Tun Pehin Sri Datuk Patinggi Abang Haji Muhammad Salahuddin bin Abang Barieng 3rd and 6th Yang di-Pertua Negeri (Governor) of Sarawak (1977–1981, 2001–2014)
 Toh Puan Norkiah @ Rokiah Bagong, Wife of Sarawak's former Governor Tun Abang Muhammad Salahuddin.
 Tun Datuk Patinggi Haji Abdul Rahman Ya'kub – former Fourth Yang di-Pertua Negeri (Governor) of Sarawak (1981–1985)
 Tun Ahmad Zaidi Adruce bin Muhammed Noor – Fifth Yang di-Pertua Negeri (Governor) of Sarawak (1985–2000)
 Datuk Haji Bujang Ulis @ Bujang Hadziri – Former Deputy Minister of Education
 Bujang Taha – Legendary bodybuilder and two-time winner of Mr Asia
 Datuk Daud Abdul Rahman – Former Tupong assemblyman
 Laila Taib – Wife of Chief Minister of Sarawak Pehin Sri Abdul Taib Mahmud
 Tan Sri Sulaiman Daud – Former Minister of Agriculture
 Suratinan Tamin (also known as Soloman Esmanto) – First Malaysian bodybuilder to win the Mr Asia title in 1969

Notable burials

 Victims of the Malaysia Airlines MH17 crash on 17 July 2014 

 Tambi Jiee (father)
 Ariza Ghazalee (mother)
 Muhammad Afif Tambi (son)
 Muhammad Afzal Tambi (son)
 Marsha Azmeena Tambi (daughter)
 Muhammad Afruz Tambi (son)

References

External links
 
 

Cemeteries in Sarawak
Muslim cemeteries
Buildings and structures in Kuching
Tourist attractions in Kuching